The English Fury at Mechelen or the Capture of Mechelen was an event in the Eighty Years' War and the Anglo–Spanish War on April 9, 1580. The city of Mechelen was conquered by Calvinist forces from Brussels which included a large contingent of English mercenaries. The city was sacked and many of its religious treasures destroyed or plundered.

Background 

In 1579, the Lordship of Mechelen was one of the few territories in the Netherlands that had remained loyal to the Spanish King. Most surrounding cities, like Antwerp, Brussels and Ghent were ruled by Calvinists. There in 1580, plans were made to take over all remaining loyal cities, to deny the Spanish army any stronghold behind the frontline.

Capture of Mechelen 

The Calvinist mayor of Brussels, Olivier van den Tympel, gathered a military force, supported by English troops under command of John Norreys and Scottish under command of Captain Stuart. After a short battle with Mechelen's Schutterij and Spanish troops the city was easily taken.

Aftermath 

The English and Scottish mercenaries under van den Tympel turned against the population, plundering homes, churches and monasteries; some tombstones were removed from the town's cemeteries and sold in England. Some sixty civilians were killed and Archbishop Mathias Hovius hid in a cupboard for three days and then fled the city, dressed as a peasant. The Carmelite monk Petrus de Wolf participated in the defence of the city and was killed by John Norreys himself with his bare hands.

Mechelen remained under Calvinist rule until it was reconquered in 1585 by the Spanish under Alexander Farnese, Duke of Parma as one of the last cities in the Southern Netherlands. The event was named the English Fury after the Spanish Fury that hit the city in 1572. However, the looting committed by the English in the same town was longer and more intense than that of perpetrated by the Spanish. Contemporary laws of war admitted three days of looting, while that committed by the English lasted nearly an entire month.

References 
Citations

Bibliography
  (Dutch)
 
 
 
External links
History Reconsidered: Eighty Years War 1568 -1648

Battles of the Eighty Years' War
Mechelen
1580 in the Habsburg Netherlands
Conflicts in 1580
Eighty Years' War (1566–1609)
Looting
History of Mechelen